Flemming Søgaard Povlsen (born 3 December 1966) is a Danish former professional footballer who played as a striker for Borussia Dortmund in Germany, among other teams. He works as football expert on TV.

Club career
Povlsen started playing football in local town Viby, but moved on to Danish top-flight club AGF Aarhus in 1984. In 1985, he was awarded the Danish 1st Division Revelation of the Year. He moved abroad in 1986, when he signed for Spanish club Castilla CF, the reserve team of multiple European champions Real Madrid. While at Castilla, he made his debut for the Denmark national team in the 5–0 win over Greece in an 1988 Olympic Games qualifier. After only a year at CF Castilla, Povlsen moved on to 1. FC Köln in Germany, where he played alongside fellow Dane Morten Olsen. Even though he wasn't a top goal scoring striker, Povlsen's speed and work rate endeared him to the fans, and he won two sets of silver medals, as the Köln team finished second in the 1988–89 and 1989–90 Bundesliga seasons. Povlsen did not play more than three matches for Köln in the 1989–90 season though, as he was bought by Dutch club PSV Eindhoven in 1989. He played the remainder of the season at PSV, going on to win the Dutch cup and finishing second in the League. He moved back to Germany, where he settled down at Borussia Dortmund in 1990.

Povlsen experienced his greatest success while at Dortmund, and quickly became a fan favourite. However, in an April 1993 game for Dortmund against 1. FC Köln, he tore his anterior cruciate ligament in the knee, and was out for recovery until October of the same year, when he made his come-back against Wattenscheid 09. In a September 1994 match in the DFB-Pokal tournament against 1. FC Kaiserslautern he suffered a cruciate ligament injury in his other knee, and though he had a short appearance in March 1995 against Eintracht Frankfurt, and thus was a part of the 1994–95 Bundesliga winning Dortmund side, Povlsen had to end his career due to his knee injuries.

International career
When he won the 1992 European Championship with the Danish national team, his reputation was on the rise. Povlsen played all five Denmark matches in the tournament, and scored once in the semi-final penalty shootout against Netherlands, after an intense battle of nerves with Dutch keeper Hans van Breukelen, Povlsen's former PSV teammate. He was a constant part of the Denmark national team from his debut in 1987 until he retired. He scored 21 goals in his 62 international appearances for Denmark, and played at the 1988 European Championship (Euro 1988) as well as Euro 1992, a tournament which Denmark won. A knee injury ended his career in March 1995.

Coaching career
Following his retirement, Flemming Povlsen became a sports director at Danish 1st Division club FC Aarhus in December 2001. As the club underwent economical downsizing in November 2002, Povlsen offered to step down, which the club accepted. He played lower league football in Brabrand and later switched to the old-boys team in his childhood club Aarhus GF. In March 2005, he became part of the coaching staff at Danish Superliga club AC Horsens. In July 2009 he joined as Assistant Coach to Randers FC but resigned on 6 October 2009 when Manager John Jensen was sacked. He is also teaching teenage kids at a football school called Hessel Gods Fodboldkostskole in Jutland.

Honours
Borussia Dortmund
 UEFA Cup: runner-up 1992–93
 Bundesliga: 1994–95; runner-up 1991–92

PSV Eindhoven
 KNVB Cup: 1989–90

1. FC Köln
 Bundesliga: runner-up 1988–89, 1989–90

Denmark
 UEFA European Football Championship: 1992

References

External links
 
 

1966 births
Living people
Association football forwards
Expatriate footballers in Germany
Expatriate footballers in the Netherlands
Expatriate footballers in Spain
Danish men's footballers
Danish expatriate men's footballers
Danish expatriate sportspeople in Germany
Danish expatriate sportspeople in Spain
Denmark international footballers
Denmark under-21 international footballers
Viby IF players
Aarhus Gymnastikforening players
Real Madrid Castilla footballers
1. FC Köln players
Borussia Dortmund players
PSV Eindhoven players
Brabrand IF players
Eredivisie players
Bundesliga players
UEFA Euro 1988 players
UEFA Euro 1992 players
UEFA European Championship-winning players
Danish expatriate sportspeople in West Germany
Expatriate footballers in West Germany